Ctenucha devisum is a moth of the family Erebidae. It was described by Francis Walker in 1856. It is found in São Paulo in Brazil and in Argentina.

References

devisum
Moths described in 1856